The 70th annual Berlin International Film Festival took place from 20 February to 1 March 2020. It was the first under the leadership of new Berlin Film Festival heads, business administration director Mariette Rissenbeek and artistic director Carlo Chatrian. The festival opened with the opening gala presented by actor Samuel Finzi followed by the world premiere of the film My Salinger Year which was selected for the Berlinale Special section. The Golden Bear was awarded to the Iranian film There Is No Evil, directed by Mohammad Rasoulof.

Jury

Main competition
The following were on the jury for the Berlinale Competition section:

International jury
 Jeremy Irons, actor (United Kingdom) - Jury President
 Bérénice Bejo, actress (France / Argentina)
 Bettina Brokemper, producer (Germany)
 Annemarie Jacir, filmmaker and poet (Palestine)
 Kenneth Lonergan, playwright and filmmaker (United States)
 Luca Marinelli, actor (Italy)
 Kleber Mendonça Filho, film director, screenwriter, producer and film critic (Brazil)

Encounters Awards Jury
The following people were on the jury for the Encounters Awards:

 Shōzō Ichiyama, producer (Japan)
 Dominga Sotomayor, film director, writer and producer (Chile)
 Eva Trobisch, film director (Germany)

Best First Feature Award Jury
The following people were on the jury for the Best First Feature Award:

 Ognjen Glavonić, film director and writer (Serbia)
 Hala Lotfy, film director, producer and founder of Hassala Films (Egypt)
 Gonzalo de Pedro Amatria, film scholar (Spain)

Documentary Award Jury
The following people were on the jury for the Berlinale Documentary film award:

 Gerd Kroske, filmmaker (Germany)
 Marie Losier, filmmaker and curator (France / United States)
 Alanis Obomsawin, filmmaker, singer and artist (Canada)

International Short Film Jury
The following people were on the jury for the Berlinale Shorts section:

 Réka Bucsi, filmmaker (Hungary)
 Fatma Çolakoğlu, curator (Turkey)
 Lemohang Jeremiah Mosese, filmmaker and artist (Lesotho)

In competition
The following films were selected for the main competition for the Golden Bear and Silver Bear awards:

Encounters
The following films were selected for the new Encounters section:

Panorama
The following films were selected for the Panorama section:

Panorama Dokumente
The following films were selected for the Panorama Dokumente section:

Berlinale Special
The following films were selected for the Berlinale Special section:

Berlinale Shorts
The following films were selected for the Berlinale shorts section:

Other sections
The Berlinale retrospective included more than 30 films by Hollywood filmmaker King Vidor. The homage was dedicated to Helen Mirren, with Mirren awarded with the Honorary Golden Bear. The Berlinale Camera was awarded to Ulrike Ottinger followed by the world premiere of Ottinger's documentary Paris Calligrammes.

The Series section, introduced in 2015, is devoted to longform television series. In 2020, there were two Australian entries: Stateless and Mystery Road Series 2.

Awards
The following prizes were awarded:

 Golden Bear – There Is No Evil by Mohammad Rasoulof
 Silver Bear Grand Jury Prize – Never Rarely Sometimes Always by Eliza Hittman
 Silver Bear for Best Director – Hong Sang-soo for The Woman Who Ran
 Silver Bear for Best Actress – Paula Beer for Undine
 Silver Bear for Best Actor – Elio Germano for Hidden Away
 Silver Bear for Best Script – Damiano and Fabio D'Innocenzo for Bad Tales
 Silver Bear for Outstanding Artistic Contribution – Jürgen Jürges for cinematography in DAU. Natasha
 Silver Bear 70th Berlinale – Delete History by Benoît Delépine and Gustave Kervern
 Golden Bear for Best Short Film – Keisha Rae Witherspoon for T
 Best First Feature – Camilo Restrepo for Los conductos
 Encounters
 Best Film — The Works and Days (of Tayoko Shiojiri in the Shiotani Basin) by C.W. Winter & Anders Edström
 Best Director — Cristi Puiu for Malmkrog
 Special Jury Award — The Trouble with Being Born by Sandra Wollner
 Special Mention — Isabella by Matías Piñeiro
 Panorama Audience Award
 1st Place: Father by Srdan Golubović
 2nd Place: No Hard Feelings by Faraz Shariat
 3rd Place: Hope by Maria Sødahl
 Panorama Audience Award – Documentaries
 1st Place: Welcome to Chechnya by David France
 2nd Place: Saudi Runaway by Susanne Regina Meures
 3rd Place: Little Girl by Sébastien Lifshitz
 Teddy Award
 Best Feature Film: No Hard Feelings (Futur drei) by Faraz Shariat
 Best Documentary/Essay Film: If It Were Love (Si c'était de l'amour) by Patric Chiha
 Best Short Film: Playback by Agustina Comedi
 Special Jury Award: Days by Tsai Ming-liang
 FIPRESCI Prize
 Competition: Undine by Christian Petzold
 Panorama: Mogul Mowgli by Bassam Tariq
 Special Mention: All Hands on Deck by Guillaume Brac
 Forum: The Twentieth Century by Matthew Rankin
 Special Mention: Overtures by The Living and the Dead Ensemble
 Encounters: The Metamorphosis of Birds by Catarina Vasconcelos
 Prize of the Ecumenical Jury
 Competition: There Is No Evil by Mohammad Rasoulof
 Panorama: Father by Srdan Golubović
 Special Mention: Saudi Runaway by Susanne Regina Meures
 Generation 14Plus
 Crystal Bear for the Best Film: Our Lady of the Nile by Atiq Rahimi
 Special Mention: White Riot by Rubika Shah
 Crystal Bear for the Best Short Film: Mutts by Halima Ouardiri
 Special Mention: Goodbye Golovin by Mathieu Grimard
 Grand Prix of the Generation 14Plus International Jury for the Best Film: My Name Is Baghdad by Caru Alves de Souza
 Special Mention: Voices in the Wind by Nobuhiro Suwa
 Special Prize of the Generation 14plus International Jury for the Best Short Film: Mutts by Halima Ouardiri
 Special Mention: White Winged Horse by Mahyar Mandegar
 Generation KPlus
 Crystal Bear for Best Film: Sweet Thing by Alexandre Rockwell
 Special Mention: H Is for Happiness by John Sheedy
 Crystal Bear for the Best Short Film: The Name of the Son by Martina Matzkin
 Special Mention: Miss by Amira Géhanne Khalfallah
 The Grand Prix of the International Jury in Generation Kplus for the Best Film: The Wolves by Samuel Kishi Leopo
 Special Mention: Cuties by Maïmouna Doucouré
 Special Mention: Mum, Mum, Mum by Sol Berruezo Pichon-Rivière
 Special Prize of the International Jury in Generation Kplus for the Best Short Film: The Name of the Son by Martina Matzkin
 Special Mention: The Kites by Seyed Payam Hosseini
 Caligari Film Prize
 Prize Winner: Victoria by Sofie Benoot, Liesbeth De Ceulaer and Isabelle Tollenaere
 Heiner Carow Prize
 Prize Winner: Garagenvolk by Natalija Yefimkina
 Compass-Perspektive-Award
 Prize Winner: Walchensee Forever by Janna Ji Wonders
 Kompagnon-Fellowship
 Perspektive Deutsches Kino: 111 by Hristiana Rykova
 Berlinale Talents: Arctic Link by Ian Purnell

References

External links
Berlin International Film Festival

70
2020 film festivals
2020 in Berlin
2020 festivals in Europe
2020 in German cinema